The Hudson River is a major river and estuary in the state of New York, United States.

Hudson River may also refer to:

 Hudson River (Georgia)

See also
 Hudson River Monster
 Hudson River Park
 Hudson River School
 Hudson River Trading
 Hudson River Wind Meditations